During the First World War, many hospital ships were attacked, sometimes deliberately and sometimes as a result of mistaken identity. 
They were sunk by either torpedo, mine or surface attack. They were easy targets, since they carried hundreds of wounded soldiers from the front lines.

Background
A hospital ship (HS) is designated for primary function as a medical treatment facility or hospital; most are operated by the military forces or navies of various countries around the world, as they are intended to be used in or near war zones.  Hospital ships were covered under the Hague Convention X of 1907.  Article four of the Hague Convention X outlined the restrictions for a hospital ship:
The ship should give medical assistance to wounded personnel of all nationalities
The ship must not be used for any military purpose
Ships must not interfere or hamper enemy combatant vessels
Belligerents as designated by the Hague Convention can search any hospital ship to investigate violations of the above restrictions.
If any of the restrictions were violated, the ship could be determined as an enemy combatant and be sunk.  Investigators from neutral countries like Spain were allowed to inspect hospital ships to confirm that Article Four wasn't being violated.

The high command of Imperial German viewed Allied hospital ships as violating the Hague Convention and ordered its submarine forces to target them as part of their Unrestricted submarine warfare on Allied shipping.  Even with the inspections from neutral countries the German High command alleged that hospital ships were violating Article Four by transporting able-bodied soldiers to the battleground.  The biggest hospital ship sunk by either mine or torpedo in the First World War was Britannic, the sister of Olympic and the ill-fated Titanic.  Britannic hit a mine on November 21, 1916; 30 people were killed, but the rest of the crew and passengers were able to escape.  The largest loss of life caused by the sinking of a hospital ship would be Llandovery Castle. The ship was hit by a torpedo from the German U-boat  on June 27, 1918.  Shortly thereafter, the submarine surfaced and gunned down most of the survivors; only 24 were rescued.  After the war, the captain of U-86, Lieutenant Helmut Patzig, and two of his lieutenants were charged with war crimes and arraigned at the Leipzig war crimes trials, but Patzig disappeared, and the two lieutenants both escaped after being convicted and sentenced to prison.  The Allies weren't the only ones who had their ships attacked at the beginning of the war, the German hospital ship Ophelia was seized by British naval forces as a spy ship and near the close of the war the Austrian hospital ship Baron Call was unsuccessfully attacked by torpedo on October 29, 1918.

Hospital Ships sunk

See also 
 List of hospital ships sunk in World War II

Notes

References

 - Total pages: 546 

Hospital ships in World War I
World War I crimes
Hospital
Lists of shipwrecks